The North America and the Caribbean Handball Confederation (NACHC) is the governing body of the Olympic sport of handball and beach handball in North America and the Caribbean. It is affiliated to the International Handball Federation (IHF).

NACHC has 21 members countries located within North America and the Caribbean. One of the IHF's six continental confederations, the NACHC was formed officially on 13 April 2019 in Santo Domingo (Dominican Republic). The NACHC headquarters is located in Colorado Springs (United States).

History
On 14 January 2018, during the IHF Council meeting, Pan-American Team Handball Federation was suspended by International Handball Federation and was divided into two continental confederations namely the North America and the Caribbean Handball Confederation and the South and Central America Handball Confederation. The IHF Council decision was taken on the fact that there were no signs of development at the level of handball and beach handball in the North American, Central American and the Caribbean countries. There was some development at the South American level but that was also not comparable to the other continents like Europe, Asia and Africa. No team from Americas had ever reached to the semifinal stage of the IHF World Men's Handball Championship and the IHF Men's Junior World Championship. The PATHF appealed to the Court of Arbitration for Sport, and it annulled the IHF's decision.

At the Extraordinary IHF Congress 2019 the IHF statues were revised to add the new federations.

On 29 October 2019 the new headquarters was opened at the bureaus of USA Team Handball.

NACHC Presidents

NACHC Secretary Generals

NACHC Council
Following are the members serving 2019 – 2023. term.

Affiliated members
North America

  Canada
  Greenland
  Mexico
  United States of America

Caribbean

  Antigua and Barbuda
  Bahamas
  Barbados
  British Virgin Islands ✝
  Cayman Islands ✝
  Cuba
  Dominica
  Dominican Republic
  Grenada ✝
  Haiti
  Jamaica
  Guadeloupe
  Martinique
  Puerto Rico
  Saint Kitts and Nevis
  Saint Lucia
  Trinidad and Tobago

 ✝ means non-active member

Tournaments

National
 Nor.Ca. Men's Handball Championship
 Nor.Ca. Women's Handball Championship

Club
 North American and Caribbean Senior Club Championship

Beach
 Nor.Ca. Beach Handball Championship

Current champions

(Titles)
(*) Record titles

References

External links
 Official website
 NACHC at IHF

 
National members of the International Handball Federation
+North America and Caribbean